Siya Mpande Mngoma (born 6 July 1988) is a South African footballer who plays for Thanda Royal Zulu as a goalkeeper.

Club career
Mngoma joined Pretoria University in 2008 from Durban Stars. He was captain of the team during the 2011–12 National First Division season as they won the league. Mngoma joined Golden Arrows in July 2012 on a two-year contract and made his debut in a 2–1 victory against Platinum Stars in May 2013.

References

1988 births
Living people
Soccer players from Pretoria
South African soccer players
University of Pretoria F.C. players
Lamontville Golden Arrows F.C. players
Association football goalkeepers